Cerro Miramundo, also known as Montaña de la Soledad, is a hill covered with dry shrubland located a few kilometers south of the city of Zacapa in Guatemala. The hill represents a panoramic point with an impressive view over the surrounding landscape.

An area of 9.02 km2 was declared a national park in 1956.

References

National parks of Guatemala
Protected areas established in 1956